Tevita Hale Nai Tu'uhoko, often known simply as Hale T-Pole or Hale T Pole, (born 30 April 1979) is a Tongan rugby union footballer who plays as a flanker or number eight for the Ricoh Black Rams in the Top League in Japan. He has also played internationally for Tonga and the Pacific Islanders.

Playing career

New Zealand

An impressive talent from a young age, T-Pole was selected to national secondary school sides and made his provincial rugby debut with Otago in 1999. He transferred to Southland in 2000, and quickly became a core member of the squad. He would go on to score 16 tries in 60 appearances for the Stags.

After several strong seasons with Southland, T-Pole made his debut for the Highlanders in the 2004 Super 12 season. After making only three appearances in his first two seasons with the Highlanders, he emerged as a regular in the 2006 Super 14 season, appearing in 10 of 13 matches including 5 starts.

In the 2007 Super 14 season, T-Pole was limited to 6 substitute appearances for the Highlanders, although he did manage to score his first and only Super Rugby try, against the Stormers on 24 February.

T-Pole's last matches for Southland were the first two rounds of the 2007 Air New Zealand Cup, after which he departed for the 2007 Rugby World Cup and then Europe.

T-Pole will return to New Zealand in 2012 and play for Northland in the ITM Cup.

Europe

T-Pole left New Zealand to sign with Ospreys for the 2007–08 Celtic League season, joining the squad after the 2007 Rugby World Cup. However, he endured a difficult season in Wales, making only 7 appearances before leaving in 2008.

Japan

T-Pole signed with Suntory Sungoliath of the Top League in Japan in 2008, and spent two seasons with the club.

For the 2010–11 season, he signed with the Ricoh Black Rams.

Return to New Zealand

In June 2012, it was announced that T-Pole had signed for Northland for the 2012 ITM Cup season. On 25 August 2012, he made his Northland debut against Otago.

Sri Lanka

Hale T-Pole has signed for Sri Lankan Premier Championship side, Havelock Sports Club, for the 2013–14 Rugby Season. He will be a player/coach for the club from Sri Lanka's Capital
Colombo. He will join Tongan National teammate Willie Hakala who played for Havelock SC last year.

International career

T-Pole represented New Zealand at the under-21 level but never received a senior callup to the All Blacks.

He was selected to the Pacific Islanders rugby union team which toured Europe in 2006, and selected again for the same tour in 2008.

T-Pole scored a try on his debut for Tonga against Korea on 10 February 2007, and was selected to the Tongan squad for the 2007 Rugby World Cup. However, his World Cup was blighted by a red-carding in a match against Samoa on 16 September.

After the World Cup, T-Pole continued as a regular member of the Tongan side until 2009.

External links

1979 births
Living people
Rugby union flankers
Rugby union number eights
Tongan rugby union players
Ospreys (rugby union) players
Highlanders (rugby union) players
Tokyo Sungoliath players
Southland rugby union players
Northland rugby union players
Otago rugby union players
Black Rams Tokyo players
People from Tongatapu
Tonga international rugby union players
Pacific Islanders rugby union players
Tongan expatriate rugby union players
Expatriate rugby union players in Japan
Expatriate rugby union players in Wales
Expatriate rugby union players in New Zealand
Tongan expatriate sportspeople in Japan
Tongan expatriate sportspeople in New Zealand
Tongan expatriate sportspeople in Wales